Visitors to the mainland of the People's Republic of China must obtain a visa from one of the Chinese diplomatic missions, unless they come from one of the visa exempt countries. The two Special Administrative Regions – Hong Kong and Macau – maintain their own independent border control policies and thus have their own separate visa requirements.

Chinese visas are issued both outside China, by the Chinese diplomatic missions, and in China, by the Exit and Entry Administrations (EEAs) of the county-level Public Security Bureaus (PSBs). In order to enter China, however, a non-Chinese national should apply to the visa-issuing authorities outside China for a Chinese visa. Because Hong Kong, Macau and Taiwan maintain their independent border control policies, ordinary Chinese visas are valid for Mainland China only and are not valid for Hong Kong, Macau or Taiwan, so travelers must apply for separate visas for Hong Kong, Macau or Taiwan should they require one for traveling to these regions.

The government of the People's Republic of China allows holders of ordinary passports issued by some countries to travel to Mainland China for tourism or business purposes for up to 15, 30, 60 or 90 days without having to obtain a visa. Visitors of other nationalities, as well as residents of Hong Kong, Macau and Taiwan, are required to obtain either a visa or a permit prior to arrival, depending on their nationality. In order to increase the numbers of tourists visiting the country, some ports of entry of China allow nationals of certain countries to visit specified regions within 72 or 144 hours if they are in transit to a third country. In 2014 the PRC government announced its intention to sign mutual visa facilitation and visa-free agreements with more countries in the future. Since then, a number of such agreements were concluded with some countries.

All non-Chinese travelers as well as Hong Kong and Macau permanent residents who stay in Mainland China for more than 24 hours must register with the local PSBs. When staying in a hotel, the registration is usually done as a part of the check-in process. When staying in a private home, however, the visitor must physically report to the local PSB within 24 hours of arrival for cities or 72 hours for rural areas. All visa-free passengers, including those in transit who stay for more than 24 hours, must adhere to the rule, as failure to comply can result in a fine or being detained by PSB for up to 15 days. Since January 2018, persons who failed to register with the local PSBs will be banned from using visa-free transit for a period of 2 years from the day the offence was recorded.

Starting from 9 February 2017, holders of non-Chinese travel documents aged between 14 and 70 have been fingerprinted upon entry, with the exception of holders of diplomatic passports.

Eligible nationalities for visa-free entry

Visa-free for ordinary passports
Holders of ordinary passports issued by the following countries do not need a visa to enter China as long as their visit does not last longer than the visa-free period listed below, unless if they are allowed to extend their stay.While most of these countries have concluded mutual visa-free agreements with China, unilateral visa waivers are also offered to several other countries.

Future Changes

Visa-free for passports for Public Affairs
The list includes countries which had signed visa-free agreements with China for holders of passports endorsed "for public affairs". Exceptions are listed below.

Visa-free for other types of non-ordinary passports

Under reciprocal agreements, holders of diplomatic, official, service, special passports or laissez-passers issued by the following jurisdictions are allowed to enter and remain in China for up to 30 days (unless otherwise noted).

 

Visa exemption agreement for diplomatic and service category passports were signed with the following countries and they are to be ratified:
 in November 2018
 in December 2019

Non-ordinary passports of Japan require visas while ordinary passport holders do not.

Merchant seamen
All merchant seamen who benefit from the visa waiver must travel on duty and hold the following documents:
 a Port Visa Notification; 
 a Letter of Employment or Letter of Guarantee issued by a Chinese shipping company;
 a seaman book; and,
 onward tickets and all documents required for their next destination if they are arriving by air in order to board a ship, or arriving by ship and proceeding to the airport.

Merchant seamen from the 11 visa-free countries can enter China without a visa if they satisfy the conditions listed above.

Merchant Seamen from the following countries can also enter China without a visa if they satisfy the conditions listed above:

APEC Business Travel Card
Holders of passports issued by the following countries who possess an APEC Business Travel Card (ABTC) containing the code "CHN" on the back of the card can enter China visa-free for business trips for up to 60 days.

ABTCs are issued to nationals of:

ABTCs are also issued to permanent residents of Hong Kong, however permanent residents with Chinese nationality are required to use their Home Return Permits instead. Only holders of non-Chinese passports can use the card to enter Mainland China.

Although Taiwan is a member of this program, its nationals are also not allowed to use ABTC to enter Mainland China, instead they are required to use Mainland Travel Permit for Taiwan Residents.

Entry procedures for residents of Hong Kong SAR, Macau SAR, and nationals of the Republic of China (Taiwan)

Due to the complicated Cross-Strait relations between mainland China and Taiwan, as well as the One Country, Two Systems policy, travelers who are nationals of PRC or ROC may not use their Taiwan, Hong Kong, or Macau passports. Instead, they are required to hold different types of permits/travel documents listed below when traveling to Mainland China.

Overview

Residents of Hong Kong or Macau Special Administrative Regions (SARs)
Hong Kong SAR and Macau SAR are constituents of China. Under the One Country, Two Systems arrangement, both SARs maintain their own immigration policies, which are vastly different from those of Mainland China, and individual border controls, which separate the territories from the Mainland. The Chinese government, however, does not consider Chinese nationals with resident status of Hong Kong and Macau traveling to China as international travelers, and hence the SAR passports (or ethnic Chinese holding British National (Overseas) passports) cannot be used when entering or transiting through China, regardless of whether they are arriving from Hong Kong, Macau, Taiwan or from overseas.

Therefore, in order to enter Mainland China, all permanent residents and some non-permanent residents of Hong Kong SAR and Macau SAR with Chinese nationality are required to apply for a Mainland Travel Permit for Hong Kong and Macao Residents (commonly called a "Home Return Permit"), a travel document which also serves as the de facto ID card in Mainland China. The permit is valid for five years for individuals under 18, or 10 years for those over 18. All first-time applicants must submit their applications to the China Travel Service (CTS) branch in Hong Kong or Macau while subsequent renewals of the permit can be done in either Mainland China or the two SARs. It is not possible to apply or renew the permit outside the PRC. Holders of the permit can enter Mainland China regardless of purpose of entry and can remain in Mainland China indefinitely, although their social benefits are restricted unlike Chinese nationals with residency in Mainland China. Home Return Permit holders also need to obtain an employment authorization from the municipal governments in order to work legally in Mainland China.

Those who need to travel to Mainland China urgently but do not have a valid Home Return Permit can apply for a Chinese Exit and Entry Permit, also only through the CTS, in Hong Kong or Macau or at the ports of Luohu and Huanggang. The Exit and Entry Permit is valid for three months and only good for a single trip to Mainland China. Unlike ROC nationals, there is no permit-on-arrival service at other ports of entry for SAR passport holders, and those seeking to enter Mainland China who arrived at a port of entry without acceptable documentations for entering will be denied entry and removed from Mainland China.

Taiwan
The PRC does not accept ROC passports for entry and transit through Mainland China, and ROC nationals with right of abode in Taiwan ("right of abode" is defined as the eligibility of holding a sign Taiwanese National ID Card) are required to apply for a Mainland Travel Permit for Taiwan Residents, commonly known as "Taiwan Compatriot Permit", before visiting Mainland China.

The 5-year permit, which also serves as the de facto ID card in Mainland China, can be applied from travel agencies in Taiwan and CTS in Hong Kong or Macau. Holders of the permit are allowed to enter Mainland China for any purpose and remain in Mainland China until the expiration date of the permit (up to five years). Those who have settled in Mainland China, however, may elect to renew their permits in Mainland China, and they can continue to reside in Mainland China provided that their permits do not expire. A 30-day stay for each visit to Hong Kong is also permitted with the strength of the permit. Like Home Return Permit holders, holders of Taiwan Compatriot Permit also require to obtain a separate employment authorization before working in Mainland China. They can, however, enjoy social benefits in certain municipalities like Shanghai once they have legally settled in Mainland China, some of which are only offered to local residents.

For those who have never held a 5-year permit or whose permit has expired, single-entry Taiwan Compatriot Permits may be applied on arrival at some airports. Those who have entered China with single-entry Taiwan Compatriot Permits can apply for a long-term permit at the local EEA office.

Applications outside the Greater China Region
As these two permits can only be applied and renewed from Mainland China, Hong Kong, Macau or Taiwan, residents of Hong Kong and Macau as well as all ROC nationals (including those without right of abode in Taiwan) can apply for a passport-like Chinese Travel Document through the Chinese foreign missions if their permits are expired or if they are residing outside the Greater China region and have never applied for the permits. The travel document is valid for up to two years. Those who also have multiple citizenship with other countries, however, are not eligible to apply for the travel document, and they must use their non-SAR or non-ROC passports (along with appropriate visas) to travel to Mainland China, or they can apply for Home Return Permits or Taiwan Compatriot Permits if they are physically in Hong Kong, Macau or Taiwan and they are eligible to do so.

Other visa-free arrangements

Tour group 
Citizens of the following countries may visit China without a visa for up to 30 days if traveling as part of a tour group that is accompanied by a representative of a tour operator registered in both countries:

Crew members
Citizens of the following countries may visit China without a visa if they are traveling as airline crew:

Nationals of  who hold an identity certificate for suite stewards on international trains can enter visa-free.

In addition, a visa is not required for crew members of airlines that have an agreement with the Chinese government exempting crew members from visa requirements.

Visa-free transit
There are two types of transit-without-visa (TWOV) programs in Mainland China: the 24-hour TWOV, available to passengers of most nationalities at most ports of entry; and the 72/144-hour TWOV, available to certain nationalities and only through specific ports of entry.

24-hour transit
Under the 24-hour TWOV policy, visa is not required for travelers who:

hold a passport valid for at least 3 months from the date of entry;
arrive by air, cruise ship or train (except for arriving at certain airports listed below);
hold confirmed air, cruise ship or train tickets to a third-country final destination outside Mainland China departing in 24 hours (standby tickets are not allowed); and,
depart Mainland China on a flight, cruise ship or train within 24 hours after arrival.

The 24-hour transit rule allows multiple stops within Mainland China for most airports, as long as the traveler has a flight, cruise or train segment leaving Mainland China in 24 hours, so it is possible to enter through a port of entry in China, take multiple segments of domestic flights within China, and depart from a different port of entry in less than 24 hours. Multi-stop transit is not allowed in some airports listed below.

Since January 2018, passengers in transit, as well as those who must leave the sterile transit area of the port of entry for any reason, must hold a passport valid for at least 3 months beyond the date of entry. In addition, under directives issued by the Ministry of Public Security, entry to China, as well as multi-stop transit, will be refused to the following categories of persons:

 Those whose travel documents are valid for less than 3 months at the time of entry;
 Those who have Chinese visa refusal stamps in their passports;
 Those who have violated Chinese immigration laws in the past 5 years (including illegal employment, illegal entry or exit, illegal residence, as well as violations of the conditions of visa-free transit);
 Those who have failed to register with the local Public Security Bureaus within the first 24 hours of entry anytime during the last 2 years;
 Those who are otherwise inadmissible to China under corresponding Chinese laws and regulations.

Like the TWOV rules of other countries, travelers must be in transit to a different country other than the country of departure, hence passengers who travel between the U.S. territories and contiguous United States, Alaska or Hawaii are ineligible for TWOV, unless one of their flights has a stop in another country or territory. The only exceptions to the rule are Hong Kong and Macau, which are considered as separate countries in this context.

Distinct from the transit rules of other countries, all travelers in transit may be required to go through immigration and customs even if they do not intend to leave the sterile transit area, except for passengers arriving and departing from Beijing Capital International Airport where they can proceed directly to the sterile transit area without immigration checks.

Unlike the 72/144-hour TWOV, most nationalities are eligible for the 24-hour TWOV except those listed below. Some individual airports, however, impose their own restrictions on certain nationalities.

Airport-specific restrictions
While a majority of Chinese international airports have no extra requirements for the 24-hour TWOV, certain airports place their own restrictions mandated by the local authorities.

The following airports are currently opting out of the TWOV program as a whole, meaning all passengers in transit through any of these airports require a visa unless they are of a visa-exempt nationality:

Fuzhou Changle International Airport
Huangshan Tunxi International Airport
Mudanjiang Hailang International Airport
Shenzhen Bao'an International Airport
Yanji Chaoyangchuan International Airport

The airport listed below has specific restrictions on transit passengers:

Ürümqi Diwopu International Airport: Passengers in transit are permitted to remain in the airport for a maximum period of 2 hours. Afterwards, they must depart Mainland China from Ürümqi immediately on an international flight. Multi-stop transit is not permitted. The airport also maintains an individual list of nationalities not eligible for visa-free transit.

Nationality-specific restrictions
Holders of the following passports are not eligible for 24-hour TWOV in most airports, and are required to hold additional permits or identity documents that are accepted by the Chinese authorities for the purpose of entering Mainland China:

 ROC passport (Taiwan Compatriot Permit required, can be obtained on arrival at certain airports)

The restriction does not apply to holders of these passports who also hold Chinese Travel Documents.

In addition to those listed above, some ports of entry place additional restrictions on nationals of certain countries:

Nationals of these countries require a visa to transit through Ürümqi Diwopu International Airport:

Nationals of the following countries are not eligible for visa-free transit in Xiamen International Airport:

72-hour stay / 144-hour stay

Holders of passports issued by the following 49 countries do not require a visa for a 72-hour or a 144-hour stay if they are transiting through the following ports of entry, provided that they:
enter through a port of entry listed below;
hold passports valid for at least 3 months from the date of intended arrival and visas for the destination countries (if required); and 
hold ticket receipts (with confirmed seats, if applicable) departing in 72 or 144 hours, which shows that their first destination (including stopovers of any kind) outside China is located in a third country. Hong Kong and Macau are considered as third territories for transit purposes.

In order to qualify for the 72 or 144-hour TWOV, the traveler's inbound and outbound flights must directly arrive at and depart from one of the acceptable ports of entry from or to a third country (including one of the two SARs). Both flights must have no stopovers of any kind within Mainland China prior to arrival or after departure at the port of entry, and the outbound flight's first stop or destination must be in a different country than the inbound flight's. Travels between U.S. territories and the contiguous U.S. are also ineligible for 72 or 144-hour TWOV, unless one of their flights has a stopover in a third country or a SAR.

A passenger who completed the inspection process will be given a temporary entry permit, which may be in the form of a stamp or a sticker, with the approved area of stay as well as date of entry and departure. The 72 or 144-hour duration of stay starts from 12:01 a.m. on the day following the date of arrival for most ports of entry. For ports of entry marked with * below, however, the duration of stay starts on the day of arrival.

Under the directives issued by the Ministry of Public Security, persons belonging to any of the following categories will not be able to use the visa-free transit and will be removed from Mainland China after arrival:

 Those whose travel documents are valid for less than 3 months at the time of entry;
 Those who have Chinese visa refusal stamps in their passports;
 Those who have violated Chinese immigration laws in the past 5 years (including illegal employment, illegal entry or exit, illegal residence, as well as violations of the conditions of visa-free transit);
 Those who have failed to register with the local Public Security Bureaus within the first 24 hours of entry anytime during the last 2 years;
 Those who are otherwise inadmissible to China under corresponding Chinese laws and regulations.

Also, ship's crew members, as well as their accompanying family members, are not eligible for 72 or 144-hour transit. They must hold appropriate visas when entering China.

Travelers utilizing the 72-hour transit scheme are only authorized to visit certain municipalities or provinces listed below, cannot leave the municipalities or provinces and must depart from the same port of entry. In contrast, travelers utilizing the 144-hour transit can enter and depart from any of the below-listed ports of entry as long as the ports are within the same region authorized to stay, although they are also not allowed to travel outside the approved regions.

Since 30 January 2016, any traveler who enters through ports of entry within Shanghai, Jiangsu Province and Zhejiang Province can stay within these areas for up to 144 hours. A similar policy was reported to be implemented throughout Guangdong Province in late 2016, and has been implemented effective May 2019. A similar scheme was jointly announced by the cities of Beijing and Tianjin, as well as Hebei Province, which entered into force on 28 December 2017. The 144-hour policy was expanded to the cities of Shenyang and Dalian in Liaoning Province on 1 January 2018. On 1 January 2019, the 144-hour policy will be expanded to the cities of Xiamen, Qingdao, Wuhan, Chengdu and Kunming.

This scheme also applies for holders of valid single or double-entry Chinese visas, who will normally be assessed by the immigration officers first to check whether their itineraries fit the rules listed above. If their travel is deemed to comply with the 72/144-hour TWOV rule and they confirm that they do not intend to leave the approved municipalities, they will be granted the 72/144-hour temporary entry permit instead and their Chinese visas will not be utilized, unless the traveler specifically requests to use the visa for entry.

Abusing the facility in any way, including cancelling the original outbound ticket and purchasing another to return directly to the inbound country, can cause the traveler to be considered as an illegal resident who will then be subject to the 5-year ban from using the facility.

Eligible countries

Eligible ports of entry
72-hour Stay

144-hour Stay

Statistics
The utilization rate of the 72 or 144-hour TWOV scheme varies significantly depending on the port of entry. Airports in Beijing, Guangzhou and the Yangtze River Delta region receive the vast majority of passengers with Shanghai seeing over 125 passengers on a daily basis and over 15,000 visitors since the commencement of the 144-hour TWOV, while airports in smaller cities such as Wuhan, Tianjin, Xi'an and Kunming received less than 50 per month since the commencement, with Kunming only received a total of 133 travelers from October 2014 to September 2016. An immigration official in Kunming even said that it could take "a few weeks" before they can see the next passenger to utilize TWOV. Officials in these cities cited the lack of awareness of the policy, the restrictions on movements, the short period of time, a lack of international flights from airports, and the shortage of services offered by travel agencies as the main reasons of the lack of passengers.

Base on a study published by Chinese travel agency Ctrip, Shanghai Pudong International Airport was the dominant airport for the TWOV scheme in the first half of 2016, receiving over 14,000 visitors or 50.14% of the total TWOV travelers during the period. Beijing Capital International Airport was a distant second with 18.31%, while Shanghai Hongqiao International Airport received 14.34%. The fourth and fifth place were Guangzhou Baiyun International Airport (6.69%) and Nanjing Lukou International Airport (1.78%). The majority of travelers utilizing the scheme were nationals of the United States, while many travelers from Canada, Germany, France, South Korea and Australia also used the facility.

The Shanghai General Station of Immigration Inspection reported that over 39,000 passengers utilized 144-hour TWOV within its first year of implementation, with an increase of over 80 percent comparing to 2015. An average of 3,000 passengers per month was also reported to be utilizing TWOV.

Region-specific visa regulations
The Chinese government has implemented visa waiver schemes or special visa regulations for foreign nationals traveling to particular areas of Mainland China or foreign nationals residing in certain regions bordering Mainland China.

Cruise ship visitors
Non visa-exempt nationals traveling with tour groups on cruise ships can enter China without a visa for a maximum stay of 15 days since 1 October 2016 (duration of stay starts from the next day of arrival). To be eligible, they must:
travel as a part of an approved tour group with a minimum of 2 people;
enter via a cruise terminal in Shanghai.

Approved groups must travel with the cruise ship within the entire duration of their trip, and can only visit the following provincial-level municipalities, provinces and autonomous regions on the trip:

Visitors utilizing this policy will not have their passports stamped and do not need to complete arrival cards or departure cards.

Passengers who boarded the cruise without joining a tour group may apply to join an existing group provided the travel agency relays the information to the Chinese authorities and receives approval before the ship's arrival. In addition, 24-hour and 144-hour TWOV policies apply to those who are not joining a tour group and are leaving China by air, train or sea in 24 or 144 hours depending on their nationality.

Transit visa on arrival at Dalian for merchant seamen
Merchant Seamen can obtain a 7-day visa on arrival at Dalian Zhoushuizi International Airport for a fee if they satisfy the following requirements:

They are nationals of a country which has diplomatic relations with the People's Republic of China
They have a ticket to a third country
They are not holders of stateless or refugees documents, holders of SAR travel documents, or nationals of the following countries:

Visa-free group tour to Pearl River Delta
All visitors to Hong Kong or Macau are able to visit the surrounding Pearl River Delta visa-free as long as the following conditions are met:

The visitor is a national of a country which has diplomatic relations with the People's Republic of China
The visitor is visiting the Pearl River Delta as part of a tour group organised by a Hong Kong or Macau based travel agency
The stay is for six days or less 
The visitor stays only within the cities of Guangzhou, Shenzhen, Zhuhai, Foshan, Dongguan, Zhongshan, Jiangmen, Zhaoqing, Huizhou and Shantou.

Visa-free group tour to Guilin for ASEAN nationals
Non visa-exempt nationals of ASEAN countries listed below can visit Guilin without a visa for a maximum of 6 days if they travel with an approved tour group and enter China from Guilin Liangjiang International Airport. They may not visit other cities within Guangxi or other parts of Mainland China.

Non-visa-exempt ASEAN countries are:

Special Economic Zone visa on arrival

Visitors from most countries may obtain an entry visa when traveling to and staying solely in the three Special Economic Zones: Shenzhen, Zhuhai and Xiamen. Visitors can only stay within these cities and cannot proceed further into other parts of Mainland China. Visas for Shenzhen are valid for 5 days, and visas for Xiamen and Zhuhai are valid for 3 days. The duration of stay starts from the next day of arrival. The visa can only be obtained only upon arrival at Luohu Port, Huanggang Port Control Point, Fuyong Ferry Terminal or Shekou Passenger Terminal for Shenzhen; Gongbei Port of Entry, Hengqin Port or Jiuzhou Port for Zhuhai; and Xiamen Gaoqi International Airport for Xiamen. Visa fees are charged on a reciprocal basis ranging from ¥168 for citizens of most countries to ¥956 for citizens of the United States.

Nationals of the following countries are ineligible for the SEZ visa for Shenzhen:

Province of Hainan

Visa Waiver
In 2010, China granted visa-free access to citizens of 26 countries who visit only Hainan. It enabled those visitors to visit Hainan Island without a visa for no more than 15 days if they are visiting as part of a tour group organised by a qualified travel agency.

On 18 March 2018, Ministry of Public Security and National Immigration Bureau announced, the visa waiver policy will be extended to nationals of the following 59 countries since 1 May 2018. Citizens of those countries do not need a visa if they only visit Hainan Island and stay no more than 30 days. This new waiver program does not require visitors to travel in tour groups anymore, though individual tourists still need to select a tour agency and inform them their schedule.

Province of Zhejiang

Non-Chinese visitors traveling as a part of a tour group belonging to a travel agency in Zhejiang Province can obtain a visa on arrival at Hangzhou Xiaoshan International Airport for a maximum stay of 1 month.

Border area
Citizens of  that are residents of Amur Oblast may visit Heihe without a visa for a day.
Citizens of  may visit Suifenhe without a visa for up to 15 days if traveling with at least one companion.
Citizens of  can visit Jeminay County (East Kazakhstan Region residents) and Tacheng in Xinjiang without a visa for three days.

Visa for Hong Kong and Macau residents who are not Chinese nationals
Non-visa-exempt nationals who are residents of Hong Kong or Macau require a visa to visit the Mainland.

All holders of Hong Kong Identity Cards are eligible to apply for a 6 or 12-month visa with multiple entries provided that they have applied for and received at least one Chinese visa in the past, are resident of Hong Kong for more than 7 months, and are not employed as domestic helpers in Hong Kong. Hong Kong permanent residents are eligible for a 3-year visa if they have received at least one 6 or 12-month multiple-entry visa in the past.

Domestic helpers in Hong Kong can apply for a single or double-entry L visa valid for one or two stays of 30 days. Multiple-entry L visas valid for 6 months with 15-day stays are available to those who have received at least one Chinese visa. All visa applicants who are domestic helpers require a written letter from the employer stating that the employer will travel together with the visa applicant to the Mainland.

Holders of Macau Resident Identity Cards are automatically eligible for multiple entry visas valid either for 6 months (for non-permanent residents) or 12 months (for permanent residents only).

Permanent residents of Hong Kong and Macau with multiple entry visas can apply for a separate sheet of paper at border checkpoints in Shenzhen and Zhuhai for Chinese entry and exit stamps.

These visa facilitation decisions are unilateral and do not supersede the visa facilitation agreements signed with other countries, which may offer visas with longer validity or lesser fees based solely on their countries of nationality.

Visa or Taiwan Compatriot Permit on arrival

Visa-on-arrival for emergency purposes
Visitors who would normally require a visa are able to obtain a visa on arrival at the following airports if they satisfy the following requirements:
have genuine emergencies which prevent them from applying for a visa in advance;
hold an invitation letter issued by a government-approved sponsor or Chinese authorities;
have confirmation from immigration authorities that the visa will be issued on arrival; and,
have a government-approved sponsor to meet them at the airport.

Visas can be issued at the following airports:

For a maximum stay of 1 month
Chengdu Shuangliu International Airport
Fuzhou Changle International Airport
Shanghai Hongqiao International Airport
Shanghai Pudong International Airport
Xiamen Gaoqi International Airport

A return ticket is required in addition to all the aforementioned documents if the passenger is arriving at one of the ports of entry listed above.

For a maximum stay of 3 months
Beijing Capital International Airport (extendable to 6 months)

No additional restrictions on stay

Nationals of the following countries are only eligible for visa-on-arrival service at Beijing, Shanghai (Pudong and Hongqiao), and Chengdu:

Nationals of the following countries are not eligible for visa-on-arrival service at Fuzhou or Xiamen:

Holders of the following documents are not eligible for this service:

 British National (Overseas) passport
 Hong Kong SAR passport
 Macau SAR passport
Refugee or stateless person travel document

Taiwan Compatriot Permit on arrival
Holders of passports issued by  can obtain a single-entry Taiwan Compatriot Permit on arrival at some airports with a Taiwan passport (with validity of more than 3 months), Taiwanese National ID card, return ticket and 2 passport-sized photos, with a fee of CNY 150. Some airports may require additional documents, such as an invitation letter. Eligible airports are: Beijing, Changchun, Changsha, Chengdu, Chongqing, Dalian, Fuzhou, Guilin, Guiyang, Haikou, Hailar, Hangzhou, Harbin, Hefei, Huangshan, Jinan, Kunming, Nanchang, Nanjing, Nanning, Ningbo, Qingdao, Quanzhou, Sanya, Shanghai, Shenyang, Shenzhen, Tianjin, Weihai, Wenzhou, Wuhan, Wuxi, Xiamen, Xi'an, Xuzhou, Yancheng, Yantai, Yinchuan, Zhangjiajie and Zhengzhou. The single-entry permit is valid for a maximum stay of 3 months but can be prolonged by applying for a long-term permit at the local EEA office.

This service is not applicable to holders of valid, long-term permits. They must instead carry the long-term permit or will be refused entry for not doing so. In addition, immigration authorities at the arrival airport have the power to deny the issuance of the permit to any person not meeting the specific requirements set forth by the airport, and the person will also be removed from Mainland China.

Visa facilitation agreements
China has concluded reciprocal visa facilitation agreements on a reciprocal basis with the following countries, and nationals covered by the agreements can have their application fees waived or reduced, or be issued long-term, multiple-entry Chinese visas at the same cost as the single-entry visas. The issuance of multiple-entry visas, however, is not automatic and must be voluntarily requested by the applicant.

As of July 2017, citizens of five countries are eligible for multiple-entry, long term visas, while citizens of two other countries are able to benefit from lowered visa fees.

Angola
China and Angola had agreed, in principle, of issuing multiple-entry visas to citizens of both countries. Under the proposed agreement, citizens of Angola may stay for 90 days out of every 180-day period. The visa would have a 12-month validity and would be valid for multiple entries. The agreement is expected to be finalized in February 2018.

Argentina
An agreement, signed by Argentine and Chinese governments and went into effect on 22 June 2015, claimed to have "facilitates application procedures" for Argentine citizens applying for Chinese visas, In reality, the procedures, processing times and validity have remain unchanged for Argentine, since the agreement in fact only facilitated the lengthy visa application procedures for Chinese nationals.

The agreement has been amended by both parties in early 2017 which paved ways to long term, multiple-entry visas. From 15 June 2017, Argentine applicants are eligible for multiple-entry L and M visas valid for 10 years. The cost for such visa is US$60 or approximately ARS$2,400.

Bolivia
A similar agreement, which have been signed and ratified by Chinese and Bolivian governments in March 2014, also only facilitates the visa application procedures for Chinese nationals. The validity, processing times and required documentations for Bolivian nationals are unchanged. Applicants who were born in the Greater China Area or who are family members of Chinese nationals can obtain multiple-entry visas with validity of 12 or 24 months.

Brazil
The agreements signed by Brazilian and Chinese governments on 1 September 2017 paved ways to the issuance of long-term tourist and business visas. The duration of stay is 90 days per entry for both L and M visas. The agreement is scheduled to be in effect on 1 October 2017, one month after the signature date.

Canada
Starting from March 2015, China announced that multiple-entry L, M, Q2, and S2 visas with the validity for up to nine years and 11 months (not exceeding the life of the passport) would be issued to citizens of Canada. The duration of stay is 60 days per entry for L and M visas, 90 days for S2 visas, and 120 days for Q2 visas. Visa applicants who are of Chinese descent can enjoy a 180-day duration of stay when applying for Q2 visas. The application fee is Can$100, and, since applying through a Visa Center is mandatory when in Canada, an "application service fee" is also charged with each application.

Chile
Arrangements were made between Chinese and Chilean governments regarding visa fees. Starting from July 2015, Citizens of Chile can have their visa fees waived when applying for F, L, M, and Q2 visas.

Israel
China and Israel's visa facilitation agreement, signed on 29 March 2016, provide citizens of Israel access to 10-year L, M, Q2 and S2 visas (validity of the visa not exceeding life of the passport). The duration of stay is 90 days per entry for L and M visas, and 180 days for Q2 and S2 visas. The cost for a visa is ₪100 for normal processing (4 working days) and ₪200 for one-day processing. The agreement went into force on 11 November 2016. The long-term visa is only available to holders of national Israeli passport and not holders of Travel Document in Lieu of National Passport (Teudat Ma'avar).

Russia
China and Russia signed the agreement on simplification of visa procedures on 22 March 2013 and the agreement went into effect on 26 April 2014. The agreement stipulates the conditions of issuing multiple-entry visas to citizens of Russia who are of certain occupations and regulated visa fees. Single-entry visas are 3,300₽, while double-entry and multiple-entry visas are capped at 6,600₽ and 9,900₽. The agreement also stated that visa fees are to be paid in the national currencies of both countries, and due to the devaluation of the rouble in 2014 and 2015, Chinese missions in Russia increased the visa fees in ruble by 120 percent on 8 July 2016 in order to reflect the most recent conversion rate to the U.S. dollar. However, since 2016, visa fees have again been officially listed in Russian ruble only.

United Kingdom
In January 2016, Chinese authorities announced that 2-year, multiple-entry L, M, Q2, S2 visas are to be issued to citizens and nationals of the United Kingdom, and the application fee is £85. In addition, Chinese foreign missions can issue visas with 5 or 10 years of validity for "eligible" British citizens and nationals. Like Canada, all visa applicants must use the service provided by the Visa Center when applying in the UK which will charge extra fees for handling applications.

United States
Since November 2014, China agreed to issue L Tourist visas, M Business visas, Q2 Family Visit visas, and S2 Short-term Private Visit visas to citizens of the United States with a validity for a maximum of 10 years; while validity of the X1 Long-term Study visa is elongated to five years. The duration of stay is 60 days per entry for the L Tourist and M Business visas, 90 days for the S2 Short-term Private Visit visas, and 120 days for the Q2 Family Visit visas. Visa applicants can enjoy a 180-day duration of stay when applying for Q2 visas if they have "special needs". The application fee for a Chinese visa is US$140 for regular processing (4 business days) and US$160 for expedited processing (2-3 business days), while 1-business-day rush processing is US$170 and only at the discretion of the consulate or embassy. Rush and expedited services are not provided by the Los Angeles consulate.

Overview of Chinese visas

Visa application procedures

Nationals who are not from visa-exempted countries are required to apply for a Chinese visa prior to entry into China. When applying for a visa, the applicant can choose to apply either through a travel agency or directly to the Chinese diplomatic missions.

In the latter case, the local diplomatic mission may outsource the handling of applications to a Chinese Visa Application Service Center (Visa Center), or a Chinese Visa Application Service Facility (CVASF). The Visa Center is "a commercial service organization registered in accordance with local laws and regulations and recognized by a Chinese Embassy or Consulate-General to handle the daily routine work of processing ordinary visa applications". The CVASF is similar organization but is run exclusively by VFS Global. Visa applicants residing in countries that host Visa Centers or CVASFs are required to submit their applications to these organizations instead of the Chinese embassies or consulates. Applicants are also required to pay service fees when applying through the Visa Centers or CVASFs on top of the visa application fees.

The most recent visa application form, form V.2013, is in use since 1 September 2013. The form can be retrieved through the website of any Chinese diplomatic mission, Visa Center or CVASF. Only forms filled out with a computer are accepted, and older versions, as well as handwritten application forms, are no longer acceptable. Visa applicants also need to physically sign the declaration box of the form. Since May 2018, fingerprints of all 10 fingers of the hands, and in some cases voiceprints, are collected as part of the application process.

Due to Covid-19 restrictions, all visas issued before 28 March 2020 became invalid except C visa and resident permit marked work, personal matters and reunion. As 15 March 2023, unexpired visas issued before 28 March 2020 were re-instated as valid

As of 2021, the following countries and territories host Visa Centers:

In addition, CVASFs are available in the following countries:

In countries without Visa Centers or CVASFs, visa application requires submitting the passport and required documents directly to the embassy or consulate.

Nationals of the following countries must hold a visa issued in their home country. If visa is issued in a third country, a residence visa or working permit from that country is also required.

Letter of invitation
The Regulations of the People’s Republic of China on Administration of the Entry and Exit of Foreigners, which went into effect on 1 September 2013, mandates some basic documentation for securing a Chinese visa. The most notable change is the requirement of a letter of invitation (LOI) when applying for most types of visa, which can only be issued by a resident of Mainland China or a company based in Mainland China. The only exceptions to this rule are for type G (transit) and L (tourism) applicants, who can either obtain a LOI, or produce their paid round-trip tickets plus the hotel reservations for the duration of their stay in Mainland China.

Former and current nationals of the People's Republic of China and their descendants
Former nationals of China who have Mainland residency and who have lost their Chinese nationality are also required to produce their Chinese passports for cancellation when applying for their first Chinese visa. The cancelled passports will be returned to the applicants along with the new Chinese visa, demonstrating their loss of Chinese nationality. The requirement, however, does not apply to Hong Kong and Macau permanent residents as their Chinese nationality is determined by their respective governments.

In some cases, a person who has or may have Chinese nationality may encounter difficulties to obtain a Chinese visa unless he or she has renounced Chinese nationality with the appropriate authorities. Numerous reports arose in June 2016 that some Canadian citizens of Chinese descent who were either born in Hong Kong or born in Canada to Hong Kong permanent resident parents of Chinese descent were refused Chinese visas. Instead, the Visa Centers directed them to the Chinese consulate who then instructed them to apply for Chinese Travel Documents on the ground that they still have Chinese nationality. The Chinese consulate in Toronto clarified that the criteria of issuing Chinese visas to "Hong Kong residents" has not been changed. Meanwhile, an official of the Vancouver consulate acknowledged the policy and said it has been in force since 1996.

Types of Chinese visas
There are four main types of Chinese visa: diplomatic visa, courtesy visa, service visa and ordinary visa. Ordinary visas are further divided into 12 sub-types or 16 categories. The sub-type codes of ordinary visas derive from the first letter of the names in Pinyin.

Validity, number of entries and duration of each stay of Chinese visas
 The "Enter Before" date is the expiration date of the visa. The visa can be used for entry into China from the date of issue until the "Enter Before" date indicated on the visa. If a visa has unused entries, the bearer can enter China before 12:00 a.m. Beijing Time on the expiration date.
 "Entries" refers to the number of times permitted to enter China during the validity of the visa. A visa becomes invalid if there are no entries left, or if there are entries left but the visa has expired. If a visa becomes invalid, its bearer must apply for a new visa before entering China. Traveling with an invalid visa will result in refusal of entry.
 "Duration of Each Stay" refers to the maximum number of days the visa bearer is permitted to remain in China for each visit. The duration of stay is calculated from (and includes) the date of entry into China.

Holders of D, Q1, J1, S1, X1 and Z visas must apply for a residence permit at the local PSB within 30 days of entry into China, unless the "Duration of Each Stay" on the visa is marked as 30 days. Members of foreign diplomatic or consular missions in China must also apply for a residence permit at the Ministry of Foreign Affairs (MFA) or local Foreign Affairs Offices (FSOs) within 30 days of entry into China.

Penalty for illegal stay
A non-Chinese or Taiwanese national whose period of stay in China exceeds the duration specified in his or her visa, stay permit or residence permit without applying for an extension, or who is found to be outside the area of approved stay, is said to be an illegal resident and is subject to fines and other penalties for violation of the Regulations of the People’s Republic of China on Administration of the Entry and Exit of Foreigners. If a non-Chinese national needs to stay in China longer than the duration of stay allowed on the visa, he or she is required to submit an extension to the EEA of the municipality before his or her duration of stay expires. Approval of an extension of stay may not be granted, in which case the traveler must depart China immediately. Chinese diplomatic missions are not authorized to extend a visa.

Illegal residents who need to depart China after they have overstayed their visas may be given either a warning, a fine of CNY 500 per day of illegal residence in China, up to a maximum of CNY 10,000, or administrative detention between five and fifteen days, depending on the severity of the situation.

ROC nationals with household registration in Taiwan are applied a separate ordinance known as Measures for the Control of Chinese Citizens Traveling to or from the Region of Taiwan. The term of "illegal resident" is also used, however a ROC national is only considered as an illegal resident when his or her Taiwan Compatriot Permit expires and he or she have not applied for renewal before the document's expiration date. The penalty for illegal residence is a warning and CNY 100 per day of illegal stay.

Region-specific visa restrictions

Tibet Autonomous Region

Non-Chinese passport holders entering Tibet must obtain a Tibet Travel Permit (TTP) prior to departure, issued by the Tibet Tourism Bureau. Although any travel between Tibet and other parts of Mainland China is considered domestic travel with no immigration checks, the TTP will be checked for all non-Chinese passport holders when going on board any buses, trains or airlines that are bounded for the TAR.

The only way to obtain a TTP is to arrange a tour operated by a Tibet-based travel agent which at least includes hotels and transportation. Visitors are also not permitted to travel by public buses across Tibet and are only allowed to travel by private transportation as organised in the tour. Moreover, if entering Tibet from Nepal, one must also join a group tour and be only allowed on a group visa. The TTP has to be handed in to the tour guide upon arrival at the airport or train station, and the tour guide will keep the permit until the traveler leaves the TAR. The processing time of a TTP is at least 15 days.

Moreover, the TTP only covers travel to Lhasa and Nagqu, and visitors who wish to visit other areas in Tibet must also apply for an Alien's Travel Permit (ATP) issued by the Foreign Affairs Section of the Lhasa PSB. The cost for the ATP is CNY 50 per person. Holders of the ATP are authorized to travel to the following restricted areas of Tibet:

Shigatse: Sakya Monastery, North Base Camp of Mt. Everest, Rongbuk Monastery
Tsetang: Samye Monastery, Valley of the Kings, Changdruk Temple, Yungbulakang Palace
Gyangtse: Palcho Monastery and Kubum Stupa 
Ngari Region
Nyingchi: Pagsum Lake
Chamdo Region

The TTP is also required by nationals of Republic of China (Taiwan) holding a Taiwan Compatriot Permit or a Chinese Travel Document, but it is not required for Chinese nationals residing in Hong Kong or Macau with a Home Return Permit, or any person with a Chinese Resident Identity Card. Hong Kong, Macau and Taiwan residents with Resident Permit are also exempt from TTP requirements. Foreign diplomats and journalists are prohibited to travel to Tibet without the permission of the Chinese government and, if approved, can only join tours that are accompanied and organized by Chinese government officials. In practice, journalists are escorted by MFA and MPS officials for the entire duration of their visit and their movements are heavily limited in order to prevent them from communicating with the Tibetans.

In March 2016, the government of TAR announced intentions of reform, which include the streamlining of TTP and ATP application procedures and shortening processing time of the permits. There is no timeline of implementation of these measures as officials claimed that they were "still being studied".

Visitor statistics
Most visitors arriving in China were from the following areas of residence or countries of nationality:

See also 

 Visa requirements for Chinese citizens
 List of diplomatic missions of China
 Visa (document)

Notes

References

External links 

 General Information for Chinese Visa Application (provided by Ministry of Foreign Affairs of the People's Republic of China)
 List of Chinese diplomatic missions

China
Foreign relations of China
Tourism in China